Group A of the 2006 Fed Cup Europe/Africa Zone Group III was one of two pools in the Europe/Africa zone of the 2006 Fed Cup. Five teams competed in a round robin competition, with the top team advanced to Group I for 2007.

Norway vs. Moldova

Turkey vs. Tunisia

Turkey vs. Moldova

Norway vs. Tunisia

Norway vs. Iceland

Moldova vs. Iceland

Turkey vs. Iceland

Tunisia vs. Moldova

Turkey vs. Norway

Tunisia vs. Iceland

  placed first in this group and thus advanced to Group I for 2007, where they placed fourth in their pool of four and thus were relegated back to Group II for 2008.

See also
Fed Cup structure

References

External links
 Fed Cup website

2006 Fed Cup Europe/Africa Zone